Communium interpretes dolorum is an encyclical by Pope Pius XII at the ending of World War II in Europe, appealing for prayers for peace during May, given at Rome, at St. Peter's on Sunday 15 April 1945, in the seventh year of his  pontificate.

Description 
The encyclical states that the Pontiff, as interpreter of the universal anguish by which almost every nation is grievously distressed,  desires to leave nothing undone to mitigate the numberless miseries and hasten the end of the great destruction. Men are unable to heal these great injuries. The human mind, blinded by  hate and rivalry, cannot easily determine a just and equitable solution of affairs along with a fraternal agreement. Divine and human rights demand unequivocally that hideous slaughter cease as soon as possible.

The month of May of every year is dedicated to the Blessed Virgin Mother of God. The Pontiff asks all, especially the children, to pray  through the intercession of Mary, that the peoples in discord, contention, and all kinds of misery, may be able to breathe again after their long-lasting distress and sorrow. Because of sins, men have turned away from God and created destruction.

 "Christian morals must be renewed both public and private life," he quotes Augustine, the Bishop of Hippo. "Change the heart and the work will be changed. Eradicate cupidity and plant charity." "Do you want peace? Do justice, and you will have peace. Justice and peace kiss one another."

It will not be easy to achieve peace in the middle of such great destruction. Many are still angry and hateful. Peace must be tempered by the impartial scale of justice, which embraces in fraternal charity all peoples and all nations and which does not bear hidden germs of discord and strife. Therefore, those who must come to agreement in this most grave cause, and those on whose recommendations not only the fate of their nations depends, but also the relationships of all mankind and the future course of the ages, especially need celestial help.

The Pope reminds of the many refugees, who are fugitives banished from their homeland and longing to once again see their own homes; for prisoners, and for those who lie in numberless hospitals. For these and for all others afflicted by this  conflict he asks for prayers to  the most merciful Mother of God.

Notes 

Encyclicals of Pope Pius XII
April 1945 events
1945 documents
1945 in Christianity